North New Brighton is a suburb on the northern side of Christchurch city. It was originally known as North Beach and was readily accessible from Christchurch city by tram. It was renamed North New Brighton in 1953.

Demographics

North Beach had a population of 4,071 at the 2018 New Zealand census, an increase of 69 people (1.7%) since the 2013 census, and a decrease of 12 people (-0.3%) since the 2006 census. There were 1,647 households. There were 2,016 males and 2,052 females, giving a sex ratio of 0.98 males per female. The median age was 37.8 years (compared with 37.4 years nationally), with 834 people (20.5%) aged under 15 years, 753 (18.5%) aged 15 to 29, 1,941 (47.7%) aged 30 to 64, and 537 (13.2%) aged 65 or older.

Ethnicities were 89.4% European/Pākehā, 15.5% Māori, 3.7% Pacific peoples, 2.4% Asian, and 1.8% other ethnicities (totals add to more than 100% since people could identify with multiple ethnicities).

The proportion of people born overseas was 16.7%, compared with 27.1% nationally.

Although some people objected to giving their religion, 60.4% had no religion, 29.0% were Christian, 0.3% were Hindu, 0.1% were Muslim, 0.2% were Buddhist and 2.8% had other religions.

Of those at least 15 years old, 504 (15.6%) people had a bachelor or higher degree, and 717 (22.2%) people had no formal qualifications. The median income was $31,500, compared with $31,800 nationally. The employment status of those at least 15 was that 1,662 (51.3%) people were employed full-time, 465 (14.4%) were part-time, and 123 (3.8%) were unemployed.

Education
Rāwhiti School is a full primary school catering for years 1 to 8. The school opened in 2015 as the result of a merger between North New Brighton, Central New Brighton and Freeville Schools.

Shirley Boys' High School is a single-sex secondary school for years 9 to 13 with a roll of  students. The school opened in Shirley in 1957 and following damage to its site in the 2011 Christchurch earthquakes, it moved to the current location in 2019.

Avonside Girls' High School is also a single-sex secondary school for years 9 to 13. It has a roll of  students. It opened in Avonside in 1919, and moved to North New Brighton in 2019 due to earthquake damage in 2011.

All of these are state schools. Rolls are as of

References

Suburbs of Christchurch
Populated places in Canterbury, New Zealand